Fabiano Ferreira Gadelha (born 9 January 1979) is a Brazilian former professional footballer who played as an attacking midfielder.

Career
Born in Bayeux, Paraíba, Fabiano Gadelha began playing professional football with Sport. He was used in several midfield positions but never found a regular place in the squad. After spells with Rio Branco and São Caetano, Fabiano Gadelha made a break-through with Marília. During 2007, he scored 15 goals for the club (11 of them in Campeonato Brasileiro Série B) playing as an attacking midfielder, which led to a six-month loan at Korean side Pohang Steelers.

His previous clubs include ABC, Náutico, Marília, São Caetano, Rio Branco, Sport Recife, Sergipe, Treze, Fortaleza, Vitória-PE, Ponte Preta and Pohang Steelers in South Korea.

Honors
Sport Recife

 Campeonato Pernambucano: 1997

Fortaleza

 Campeonato Cearense: 2003

References

External links

1979 births
Brazilian footballers
Brazilian expatriate footballers
Association football midfielders
Living people
Sport Club do Recife players
Fortaleza Esporte Clube players
ABC Futebol Clube players
Treze Futebol Clube players
Club Sportivo Sergipe players
Rio Branco Esporte Clube players
Associação Desportiva São Caetano players
Marília Atlético Clube players
Pohang Steelers players
K League 1 players
Clube Náutico Capibaribe players
Expatriate footballers in South Korea
Associação Atlética Ponte Preta players
Brasiliense Futebol Clube players
Brazilian expatriate sportspeople in South Korea
Sportspeople from Paraíba